Dirk Bergemann is the Douglass & Marion Campbell Professor of Economics and Computer Science at Yale University.  He received his Vordiplom in economics at Goethe University Frankfurt in 1989, and both his M.A. and Ph.D. at the University of Pennsylvania in 1992 and 1993, respectively.

Bergemann's research is concerned with game theory, contract theory and mechanism design. His research has been supported by grants from the National Science Foundation, the Alfred P. Sloan Research Fellowship and the German National Science Foundation. Bergemann is the foreign editor for the Review of Economic Studies, and the associate editor of several other publications, including American Economic Journal, Econometrica, Games and Economic Behavior, and the Journal of Economic Theory.

Bergemann has made important contributions to the theory of mechanism design. In his work with Stephen Morris on robust mechanism design, they relaxed common knowledge assumptions which were prevalent in the early mechanism design literature. By formulating the mechanism design problem more precisely, they showed that simple mechanisms arise endogenously. This provided a theoretical justification for the relatively simple auction designs employed in practice, when compared to the complexity of optimal auctions suggested by the early literature.

Bergemann has also pioneered work with consumer behavior around dynamic pricing structures. He is a fellow of the European Economic Association.

Publications
1. “Robust Monopoly Pricing”, 2011, Journal of Economic Theory, 146, 2527–2543, joint with Karl Schlag.

2. “Mechanism Design with Limited Information: The Case of Nonlinear Pricing”, 2011 2nd International ICST Conference on Game Theory for Networks, Shanghai, 2011, joint with Ji Shen, Yun Xu, and Edmund Yeh.

3. “Targeting in Advertising Markets: Implications for Online vs Online Media”, 2011, RAND Journal of Economics, 42, 414-443 (lead article) joint with Alessandro Bonatti.

4. “Rationalizable Implementation”, 2011, Journal of Economic Theory, 146, 1253–1274, joint with Stephen Morris and Olivier Tercieux.

5. “Robust Implementation in General Mechanisms”, 2011, Games and Economic Behavior, 71, 261–281, joint with Stephen Morris.

6. “The Dynamic Pivot Mechanism”, 2010, Econometrica, 78, 771–789, joint with Juuso Valimaki.

7. “Robust Implementation in Direct Mechanisms” 2009, Review of Economic Studies, 76, 1175–1204, (lead article), joint with Stephen Morris.

8. “Information Acquisition in Interdependent Value Auctions”2009, Journal of the European Economic Association, 7, 61-89, joint with Xianwen Shi and Juuso Valimaki.

9. “Robust Virtual Implementation” 2009, Theoretical Economics, 4, 45–88, joint with Stephen Morris.

10. “The Role of the Common Prior in Robust Implementation”, 2008, Journal of the European Economic Association Papers and Proceedings, 6, 551–559, joint with Stephen Morris.

11. “Pricing without Priors”, 2008, Journal of the European Economic Association Papers and Proceedings, 6, 560–569, joint with Karl Schlag.

12. “Ex Post Implementation” 2008, Games and Economic Behavior, 63, 527–566, joint with Stephen Morris.

13. “Information Structures in Optimal Auctions”, 2007, Journal of Economic Theory, 137, 580–609, joint with Martin Pesendorfer.

14. “Dynamic Pricing of New Experience Goods”, 2006, Journal of Political Economy, 114, 713–743, joint with Juuso Valimaki.

15. “Optimal Pricing with Recommender Systems”, 2006, Proceedings of ACM-EC 06 ; 43–51, ACM Press, New York, joint with Deran Ozmen.

16. “Efficient Recommender Systems”, 2006, Proceedings of IEEE-CEC 06; joint with Deran Ozmen.

17. “Dynamic Price Competition”, 2006, Journal of Economic Theory, 127, 232–263, joint with Juuso Valimaki.

18. “Flexibility as an Instrument in Digital Rights Management,”2005, Proceedings of Workshop on Economics of Information Security (WEIS), joint with Thomas Eisenbach, Joan Feigenbaum, and Scott Shenker.

19. “The Financing of Innovation”, 2005, RAND Journal of Economics, 36, 719–752, (lead article) joint with Ulrich Hege.

References

Living people
Fellows of the Econometric Society
Goethe University Frankfurt alumni
University of Pennsylvania alumni
Yale University faculty
Year of birth missing (living people)
Fellows of the European Economic Association